Suarezia is a genus of woodlice, in the family Scleropactidae, containing the two species Suarezia differens and Suarezia heterodoxa, both of which are endemic to Madagascar.

References

Woodlice
Arthropods of Madagascar
Endemic fauna of Madagascar